Acraea chambezi is a butterfly in the family Nymphalidae. It is found in eastern Zambia and Malawi.

Description

A. chambezi Neave is very similar to A. nohara (55 c), only differing in having the veins of the forewing above very finely black at the distal margin; the discal dot in 4 of the forewing is not placed in the same line as the dots in cellules 5 and 6 and the discal dot in 5 of the hindwing is absent; the discal dot in cellule 3 of the hindwing is placed near the base of the cellule; forewing usually with basal dot in cellule 1b. North-East Rhodesia.

Biology
The habitat consists of Brachystegia woodland (Miombo).

Taxonomy
It is a member of the Acraea cepheus species group. See also Pierre & Bernaud, 2014.

References

Butterflies described in 1910
chambezi